Qaragüney is a village and municipality in the Sabirabad District of Azerbaijan. It has a population of 2,532.

References 

Populated places in Sabirabad District